The Bagley train wreck (also known as the Great Salt Lake wreck) occurred in Utah, United States, on the morning of Sunday December 31, 1944. The crash killed 50 (initially reported as 48), including over 35 military personnel, and injured 81.

Pacific Limited
The wreck involved Southern Pacific's Pacific Limited as it crossed the Great Salt Lake on the Lucin Cutoff. It had departed from Chicago at 10 a.m. the prior Friday (Dec 29), bound for San Francisco and normally traveled in one long section, but on this occasion it was split into two, with the passenger train running ahead of the mail express.

Early that morning an unusually long and heavy freight train developed problems (unofficially a hot box) whilst traveling west from Ogden. This required First 21, the first section of the Pacific Limited comprising 18 cars headed by SP GS-3 No. 4425, to stop and then proceed with caution. Second 21, the second section comprising 20 cars headed by SP Mt-4 No. 4361, apparently unaware of the problems ahead, continued at full speed.

First 21 departed Ogden at 4:38 a.m. Second 21 departed Ogden at 4:50 a.m. (50 minutes late) and passed two stop signals before the collision.

The Ogden Standard-Examiner reported "The force of the impact sent another sleeping car smashing through the dining car and farther ahead slammed one coach into the wooden coach ahead of it. Cars of the mail express section piled up crossways of the track behind the engine, some of them sliding down the causeway embankment into water. Most of the dead were taken from the rear Pullman car and from the telescoped coach." Several cars in First 21 telescoped: the thirteenth into the twelfth, the sixteenth into the fifteenth, and the locomotive of Second 21 into the eighteenth. The twelfth, fifteenth, and eighteenth cars of First 21 were demolished, and the locomotive and first eleven cars of Second 21 were derailed.

Aftermath and investigation
At the site of the crash, the tracks run along a causeway across desolate mud and shallow water, so all rescue efforts had to come by rail. Two hospital cars were included in the passenger train (First 21) manned by members of the Medical Corps and tended the injured until rescue trains arrived from Ogden.

The official inquiry into the accident concluded 'this accident was caused by failure to properly control the speed of the following train in accordance with signal indications.' First 21 had seen the two preceding stop signals and its engineers were preparing to halt when that train was struck by Second 21. After the fireman on Second 21 missed the first stop signal due to heavy fog, he reported the missed signal to the engineer; the fireman then saw the second stop signal and relayed it to the engineer, but did not witness the engineer of Second 21 respond by slowing the train. Most of the crew of Second 21 were resting in the rearmost car and were not aware of any issues until the brakes were applied, approximately 12 seconds before the collision. Both the engineer of Second 21 and the flagman of First 21 were killed.

Although the engineer of Second 21 had applied the brakes, the position in which he was found indicated that he had been incapacitated prior to the collision. A coroner's inquest concluded the engineer had died from sudden shock or heart failure just before the crash.

References

External links
Bagley, UT Train Wreck

Railway accidents in 1944
Railway accidents and incidents in Utah
1944 in Utah
Transportation in Weber County, Utah
Railway accidents involving fog
Accidents and incidents involving Southern Pacific Railroad
Great Salt Lake
December 1944 events
Train collisions in the United States